Waverton is a village and civil parish on the outskirts of Chester in the unitary authority of Cheshire West and Chester and the ceremonial county of Cheshire, England. It is almost continuous with the village of Rowton to the north west and that in turn is almost continuous with Christleton. According to the 2011 Census, the population of the parish was 1,587.

The village's Anglican church is dedicated to St. Peter. The village has an Evangelical church and there is a Methodist church on the edge of the village in the parish of Rowton. The village has a post office, a number of shops, a takeaway, hairdressers, a primary school and a pub called the Black Dog. The village is home to the outdoor children's adventure attraction, the Crocky Trail. The Waverton Good Read Award was founded in 2003 for first-time UK novelists. Waverton Business Park is also located in the village, off the A41.

The Shropshire Union Canal (originally Chester Canal) runs through the middle of Waverton. The village had a railway station on the North Wales Coast Line until it closed in the 1960s. The line, which runs between  Chester, Crewe, and North Wales, is named Route 22 on Network Rail's 2006 reorganisation. Services on this line are offered by Transport for Wales, and, as the "London to Holyhead" spur of the West Coast Main Line route, by Avanti West Coast. The train station is now a bus depot run by Stagecoach Merseyside & South Lancashire.

The village also has a large junior football team, AFC Waverton, which competes in both the Chester and District Junior Football League and the Ellesmere Port Junior Football League.

History
The settlement was named Wavretone in the Domesday Book, where it was said to be in the Dudestan Hundred. The name was first given as Waverton in 1260, having been called Waueretone in 1150, and Wauertone in 1100. The origin of the name is not certain. The Church of St Peter's nave has a roof that has been dated to 1665. The tower, on the west end of the building, is built in the Perpendicular Style and possess a nineteenth-century pyramidal roof. Although the church was restored in the 1880s, the chancel's timber framing, the windows, and clerestory are all original. New residential developments led to a significant expansion of the village in the 20th Century. Until the late 1970s there was a chemical works located on the canal in the centre of Waverton. Residents of the village tend to be commuters to Liverpool and Manchester with easy access to the M53 motorway and M56 motorway, as well as into Chester city centre.

Notable people
Joseph Wright (greyhound trainer), born in Waverton 1824. He farmed at Avenue Farm, previously being the innkeeper of The White Horse public house in the village
Jack Wright (greyhound trainer), born in Waverton 1850
Joe Wright (greyhound trainer), born in Waverton 1855
Robert Kelsell Wright, born in Waverton 1858, slipped the Waterloo Cup finals in 1890 & 1895. He farmed at Well House Farm.
Tom Wright (greyhound trainer), born in Waverton 1861

See also

Listed buildings in Waverton, Cheshire
Waverton school and schoolmaster's house

References

External links

 Waverton website

Villages in Cheshire
Civil parishes in Cheshire